Amir Zaki may refer to:

Amir Zaki (artist) (born 1974), American artist
Amr Zaki (born 1983), Egyptian footballer
Aamir Zaki (1968–2017), Pakistani guitarist